Sebastiania glandulosa is a species of flowering plant in the family Euphorbiaceae. It was originally described as Excoecaria glandulosa Sw. in 1800. It is native to northcentral and southeast Mexico, Guatemala, Jamaica, and western Cuba.

References

Plants described in 1800
Flora of Guatemala
Flora of Mexico
Flora of Cuba
Flora of Jamaica
glandulosa
Flora without expected TNC conservation status